Sebastián García Rodríguez (born 4 March 1989) is a Spanish professional golfer who plays on the European Tour.

Career
García enjoyed a successful 2019, beginning the year with two victories on the Alps Tour and ending it as a Challenge Tour graduate as he finished 15th on the Road to Mallorca Rankings to earn a maiden card for the European Tour. His best finishes on the Challenge Tour were runner-ups at the Challenge de España and the Open de Portugal. 

On the 2020 European Tour, he led the Hero Open in England at the halfway point. He was 4th at the Austrian Open and tied 6th at the Portugal Masters, to finish 130th in the Race to Dubai. 

On the 2021 European Tour, he held the overnight lead after an opening round of 64 at the BMW International Open in Germany, won by Viktor Hovland. He was 4th at the Magical Kenya Open, tied for 8th at the Tenerife Open, and tied 5th at the Mallorca Golf Open, to finish 120th in the Race to Dubai and narrowly keep his card.

Professional wins (3)

Alps Tour wins (3)

See also
2019 Challenge Tour graduates

References

External links

Spanish male golfers
European Tour golfers
Golfers from Madrid
1989 births
Living people
20th-century Spanish people
21st-century Spanish people